is a Japanese voice actor and singer affiliated with Arts Vision.  Some of his major anime roles include Son Goku in Saiyuki, Kira Yamato in Gundam Seed, Gundam Seed Destiny, Kazuki Fuuchouin in GetBackers, Masaru Daimon in Digimon Savers, Kaoru Hanabishi in Ai Yori Aoshi, and Tomoki Sakurai in Heaven's Lost Property. In video game franchises he voices Sanada Yukimura in Sengoku Basara, Keiichi Maebara in Higurashi When They Cry, Kilik in Soulcalibur, and various characters in Haruka: Beyond the Stream of Time. He partially voices Shirogane Takeru in the Muv-Luv series. Hoshi was also known for his voice roles of villains as Goro Akechi from Persona 5, Death Gun from Sword Art Online, and Lio Shirazumi in The Garden of Sinners.

For his work, Hoshi has been awarded the voice acting award in the Anime Grand Prix in both 2005 and 2006. Additionally, in the 2007 Seiyu Awards,  Hoshi was a nominee in the category "Best Actors in supporting roles" for his portrayal as Kira Yamato in the Mobile Suit Gundam SEED Destiny.

Filmography

Anime

Film

Video games

Tokusatsu

Drama CD

Dubbing

Discography

Albums

References

External links
  
  
 
 Sōichirō Hoshi at GamePlaza-Haruka Voice Acting Database 
 Sōichirō Hoshi at the Seiyuu.info database
 

1972 births
Living people
Male voice actors from Fukushima Prefecture
Japanese male video game actors
Japanese male voice actors
Japanese male pop singers
King Records (Japan) artists
Musicians from Fukushima Prefecture
20th-century Japanese male actors
21st-century Japanese male actors
21st-century Japanese singers
21st-century Japanese male singers
Arts Vision voice actors
People from Aizuwakamatsu